The 2010–11 season was Udinese Calcio's 16th consecutive and 31st Serie A season. The club competed in both Serie A and the Coppa Italia. Udinese finished in fourth place to qualify for the play-off round of the 2011–12 UEFA Champions League.

Players

Squad information
Updated 28 January 2010

Transfers
For all transfers and loans pertaining to Udinese for the current season, please see: 2010 summer transfers and 2010–11 winter transfers.

Summer 2010

In

Out

Winter 2010–11

Out

Pre-season and friendlies

Competitions

Serie A

League table

Results summary

Results by round

Matches

Coppa Italia

Statistics

Appearances and goals

|-
! colspan="14" style="background:#dcdcdc; text-align:center"| Goalkeepers

|-
! colspan="14" style="background:#dcdcdc; text-align:center"| Defenders

|-
! colspan="14" style="background:#dcdcdc; text-align:center"| Midfielders

|-
! colspan="14" style="background:#dcdcdc; text-align:center"| Forwards

|-
! colspan="14" style="background:#dcdcdc; text-align:center"| Players transferred out during the season

|-

References

Udinese Calcio seasons
Udinese